Strut is an American reality television series that premiered on September 20, 2016, on the Oxygen cable network. Announced in May 2016, the reality series follows the professional lives of a group of transgender models. The show is executive produced by Whoopi Goldberg. The show features models Laith Ashley, Dominique Jackson, Isis King, Ren Spriggs, and Arisce Wanzer.

"[The models] are struggling with things we can all relate to — trying to make ends meet, fighting to make a name for themselves and navigating the minefields of personal relationships. All of these struggles are amplified by the fact that they are also fighting to break down barriers and taking on the responsibility of representing the transgender community in today's society. It's time to separate caricature from real people, and that’s what we are doing with Strut," said Goldberg. During the season finale Richard H. Lowe, III the International Creative Director for Spiegel (catalog) selects Arisce Wanzer to be featured as the first trans covergirl for an American catalog company. The photoshoot and journey of this cover are documented on Season 1 | Episode 6 which aired on Oct 25 9/8c EST.

Episodes

See also 

 The Prancing Elites Project (2015)
 Transparent (2014)
 Media portrayals of transgender people

References

External links
 
 
 

2010s American reality television series
2016 American television series debuts
Transgender-related television shows
English-language television shows
Oxygen (TV channel) original programming
American LGBT-related reality television series
LGBT African-American culture
2010s LGBT-related reality television series
2010s American LGBT-related television series